Ming ( 1499–2006), also known as Hafrún, was an ocean quahog clam (Arctica islandica, family Arcticidae) that was dredged off the coast of Iceland in 2006 and whose age was calculated by counting annual growth lines in the shell. Ming was the oldest individual (non-colonial) animal ever discovered whose age could be precisely determined. 

Thought to be 405 years old, Ming was later determined to be 507 years old, although the clam had previously been killed to make this determination. The size of the clam was 87 mm × 73 mm.

Name
The clam was initially named Ming by Sunday Times journalists, in reference to the Ming dynasty, during which it was born. The actual sex of the clam, however, is unknown, as its reproductive state was recorded as "spent".

Original discovery
The clam was dredged off the northern coast of Iceland in 2006. In 2007, on the basis of counting the annual growth bands on the cross-sectional surface of the hinge region of the shell, researchers announced that the clam was 405 years old. The research was carried out by researchers from Bangor University. In the process the clam died.

Professor Richardson said that the existence of such long-lived species could help scientists discover how some animals reach such advanced ages.

The mollusk's long life came to an end in 2006 when the researchers – unaware of the animal's exceptional age – froze the specimen, killing it.

Revision of age

In 2013, another assessment of the age of the clam was carried out counting bands which were measured on the sectioned surface of the outer shell margin and this was verified by comparing the banding patterns with those on other shells that were alive at the same time; this confirmed that the clam was 507 years old when it was caught. The revised age estimate is also supported by carbon-14 dating; marine biologist Rob Witbaard commented that he considers this second assessment accurate to within 1–2 years.

See also
List of long-living organisms

References

Individual molluscs
1499 animal births
2006 animal deaths
Arcticidae
Individual wild animals
Oldest animals
Clams